The 1984 Colgate Red Raiders football team was an American football team that represented Colgate University as an independent during the 1984 NCAA Division I-AA football season.

In its ninth season under head coach Frederick Dunlap, the team compiled a 5–5 record. John McCabe and Bob Clark were the team captains.

The Red Raiders won their first three games against Division I-AA opponents and became a constant presence in the weekly national rankings, reaching as high as No. 10 in the poll released October 2 (a Colgate bye week). A streak of three losses at the end of the year, however, dropped them out of the rankings and resulted in a .500 season record.

The team played its home games at Andy Kerr Stadium in Hamilton, New York.

Schedule

References

Colgate
Colgate Raiders football seasons
Colgate Red Raiders football